Emil Fischer (1852–1919) was a German Nobel laureate in chemistry.

Emil Fischer may also refer to:
 Emil Fischer (bass) (1838–1914), German dramatic basso
 Emil Fischer (cartographer) (1838/9–1898), German-born American cartographer
 Emil R. Fischer (1887–1958), American businessman and former president of the Green Bay Packers

See also
 Franz Joseph Emil Fischer (1877–1947), German chemist, worked with oil and coal